Bambang Hary Iswanto Tanoesoedibjo or Hary Tanoesoedibjo, also known as Hary Tanoe for short (born September 26, 1965) is an Indonesian businessman and politician. He is the President Director of PT MNC Investama Tbk, which he founded in 2009. As the chairman, he oversees and develops the strategy of the holding company and its subsidiaries, including a media giant Media Nusantara Citra (MNC).

In the media sector, he has served as President Director of PT Global Mediacom Tbk since 2002, President Commissioner of PT MNC Sky Vision Tbk since 2006, and as President Director of RCTI since 2010, having previously served this last position between 2003 and 2008. In the non-media sector, he serves as President Commissioner of PT MNC Kapital Indonesia Tbk since 1999, President Commissioner of PT MNC Securities since 2004, Commissioner of PT Global Transport Services since 2010, President Director of PT MNC Land Tbk since April 2011, and President Director of PT MNC Energi since 2012.

In addition to his role as a speaker at national and international media events, he lectures in post-graduate programs at several universities in the fields of corporate finance, investment and management strategies.

Early life
Tanoesoedibjo was born in Surabaya, East Java, Indonesia, on 26 September 1965, the son of a local businessman Achmad Tanoesoedibjo (1940-2000) and his wife, Lilek Yohana. His father is a devout Muslim and close to Abdurrahman Wahid, Indonesia's fourth President. He is the youngest of three siblings. After finishing high school, he studied at Carleton University with his siblings and cousins in Canada. In 1988, he gained a bachelor's degree in Commerce, then an MBA completed in 1989 at the University of Ottawa. Tanoesoedibjo married Liliana Tanaja Tanoesoedibjo and they have five children.

Business empire

Tanoesoedibjo founded PT. MNC Investama in Surabaya on 2 November 1989 and moved its headquarters to Jakarta in 1990. The company was initially named PT Bhakti Investments (later changed to PT Bhakti Investama Tbk) and focused primarily on capital-market activities. The Indonesian government, which was in the 1980s and early 1990s still pursuing a deregulation policy, provided a number of facilities to boost Indonesia's capital market.

The company relocated to Jakarta in February 1990. In 1994, it expanded to include securities trading and brokerage, investment management, underwriting, origination and syndication, financial advisory and research services, as well as mergers and acquisitions, followed by the launch of mutual fund products. The company listed its stock on the Jakarta Stock Exchange and the Surabaya Stock Exchange in a 1997 IPO.

PT Bhakti Investama Tbk restructured through several mergers and acquisitions. It diversified the products and services offered into media, energy, natural resources and infrastructure.
The company changed its name to PT MNC Investama Tbk at a general meeting of shareholders on 2 May 2013 and the change was approved by the Ministry of Law and Human Rights on 23 August 2013. The stock code remained unchanged as BHIT.

In 2011, Tanoesoedibjo launched JKT48, an all-girl idol singing group, with Yasushi Akimoto in MNC Tower Headquarters.

He was listed by Forbes as the 29th richest Indonesian in 2016, with wealth of $1.15 billion.

Politics
In August 2011, Tanoesoedibjo joined the Nasdem Party (Partai Nasional Demokrat), an Indonesian political party founded by Surya Paloh. By late 2012, there were rumors of a leadership struggle between Tanoesoedibjo and Paloh. On 17 February 2013, Tanoesoedibjo quit the Nasdem Party due to his disappointment over Paloh's changes to the party's strategy. In mid-2013, Tanoesoedibjo joined the People's Conscience Party (Hati Nurani Rakyat, Hanura) led by former military commander Wiranto. Tanoesoedibjo said Hanura had a better vision and mission for Indonesia, whereas Nasdem had lost its idealism. On 2 July 2013, the Hanura Party named Wiranto and Tanoesoedibjo as its candidates for the presidency and vice presidency for Indonesia's 2014 presidential election. Hanura won only 2.86% of votes in Indonesia's 2014 general election, below the required threshold to field a presidential candidate. Hanura joined a coalition of parties backing Joko Widodo, who won the election. The decision to support Widodo prompted Tanoesoedibjo to quit from the party in May 2014, as he supported former general Prabowo Subianto for the presidency.

In 2015, Tanoesoedibjo formed his own party called Partai Perindo (Indonesian Unity Party). As a business partner of US President Donald Trump, Tanoesoedibjo said he felt inspired by him and may try to run for president of Indonesia.

Tanoesoedibjo and his wife attended the Inauguration of Donald Trump and met with members of the US president's family. MNC's corporate secretary Arya Sinulingga earlier said that Tanoesoedibjo and his wife would have business meetings with Trump's two oldest sons. "He will meet his business partners ahead of the inauguration."

Controversy
In June 2017, Tanoesoedibjo was barred from leaving the country between 22 June and 12 July after allegedly sending a series of threatening text messages to Yulianto, a deputy attorney general for special crimes, who is investigating a tax restitution to telecommunications firm Mobile-8 in 2009. Tanoesoedibjo was the commissioner of the company at the time. In his book about Trump, "The Big Cheat", David Cay Johnston says that Tanoesoedibjo "calls himself the Trump of Indonesia" and that he says he "expects to become President of Indonesia in a few years". Johnston also states that "Tanoesoedibjo's MNC Group is in serious debt to the Chinese government" - another troubling similarity to the Trump organisation, and Johnston also infers that Tanoesoedibjo is as corrupt as his American role model.

References

Living people
1965 births
Indonesian people of Chinese descent
Carleton University alumni
University of Ottawa alumni
Indonesian businesspeople
Indonesian billionaires
Indonesian socialites
MNC Corporation